The women's 800 metre freestyle competition of the swimming events at the 1983 Pan American Games took place on 21 August. The last Pan American Games champion was Kim Linehan of the United States.

This race consisted of sixteen lengths of the pool, all in freestyle.

Results
All times are in minutes and seconds.

Heats

Final 
The final was held on August 21.

References

Swimming at the 1983 Pan American Games
Pan